The Cal Poly Mustangs women's basketball team represents California Polytechnic State University, located in San Luis Obispo, California. The school's team currently competes in the Big West Conference, which they have played in since 1996, two years after joining Division I. The team plays its home games in Mott Athletics Center.

History
Cal Poly began playing women's basketball at the intercollegiate level in 1974 in the AIAW, with NCAA-sponsored play beginning in 1981.

The Mustangs have had three teams tie for the school record for wins (21) in a season: the 1981-82 squad coached by Marilyn McNeil and the 2008–09 and 2012-13 squads coached by Faith Mimnaugh.

Following Sharon Chatman (1974–75) and Mary Stallard (1975-79), McNeil coached Cal Poly from 1979 to 1986 before becoming an athletics administrator on campus. In 1994, McNeil departed Cal Poly to become the athletic director at Monmouth University, from which she retired in 2021. Taking over after Jill Orrock (1986–95) and Karen Booker (1995-97), Mimnaugh served as head coach from 1997 to 2022, when she retired. McNeil's overall-games winning percentage of .488 (98-103) ranks tops in program history, while Mimnaugh ranks as the winningest coach in the school's history of conference games percentage, at .482 (191-205).

The furthest the team has advanced came in March 2013, when Cal Poly defeated Pacific 63-49 to win the Big West Conference women's basketball tournament, their first conference tournament championship after two previous years of regular-season titles. Seeded 14th in their ensuing NCAA Tournament appearance, they lost 85-55 to Penn State in the first round. Cal Poly qualified for the semifinal round of the Big West Tournament in March 2020, but the postseason was abruptly canceled due to COVID-19 after the Mustangs had won comfortably twice in the tournament's earlier rounds.

The team has made three WNIT appearances, losing to California (Berkeley) in 2011, Washington in 2012 and San Diego in 2014.

Shanele Stires, former WNBA player and head coach at Cal State East Bay, was hired as the team's seventh head coach on April 14, 2022.

Division I Season-by-Season Results

NCAA tournament results

Pro Basketball Alumni 

 Former Cal Poly forward Kristina Santiago won three consecutive (2013–15) Bulgarian NBL Playoffs MVP awards after leading her club, Dunav 8806, to consecutive titles. After a stint with Hapoel Rishon LeZion in Israel, Santiago rejoined Dunav 8806 in December 2013. The former All-America honorable mention then signed with Helios in Vétroz, Switzerland, before being acquired by BC Alte Kanti Aarau of the Swiss Ligue Nationale. She averaged 22.4 points (on 55.6-percent shooting) and 9.3 rebounds for Aarau in 2016-17.
 Rachel Clancy, a former third-team Academic All-American, played for Real Canoe Natación in Madrid during the fall of 2011.
 Molly Schlemer signed with the ChemCats Chemnitz of Germany in October 2014. In September 2015, following her All-EuroBasket rookie season, Schlemer was picked up by Urla Belediyesi Gencli in Turkey, where she was the TKBL’s third-leading scorer on the way to all-league second-team honors. Most recently in 2018, Schlemer led Edirne Belediyesi averaging 22.3 points (ranking No. 1 in the Turkish league) along with 11.7 rebounds (fourth throughout the TKBL).
 In 2019, alumni Dynn Leaupepe and Lynn Leaupepe became the fourth and fifth former Mustangs women's basketball players to embark on pro careers. Dynn Leaupepe, with Basketball Klubben Amager in the Copenhagen suburb of Kastrup, Denmark, finished her rookie year winning the Dameligaen Player of the Year accolade after leading her club to the Danish title, 3-1 in a five-game series over Stevnsgade. 
 Meanwhile Lynn Leaupepe plays for the Sunbury Jets in Victoria, Australia. Sunbury, coached by Kennedy Kereama, trains at Boardman Stadium just over 25 miles northwest of Melbourne.
 In 2021-22, former Mustang Sierra Campisano played in the preseason with the WNBA's Chicago Sky, before signing with BKG Prima in Hungary. She averaged 16.7 points and 6.8 rebounds as a rookie overseas.
 Cal Poly graduate Kirsty Brown signed with the Leicester Riders of the Women's British Basketball League in August 2022.

USA Basketball Participants 

  Laura Buehning, a first-team WBCA College Division All-American in 1982 while playing for Cal Poly, played for Team USA at the 1980 William Jones Cup in Taiwan.

References

External links